The USRA Heavy Mikado was a USRA standard class of steam locomotive designed under the control of the United States Railroad Administration (USRA), the nationalized railroad system in the United States during World War I.  These locomotives were of 2-8-2 wheel arrangement in the Whyte notation, or 1′D1′ in UIC classification. A total of 233 locomotives were built to this plan for the USRA; postwar, it became a de facto standard design, which was built to the total of 957 locomotives including the USRA originals and all subsequent copies.

Heavy Mikado used the same running gear as the USRA Light Mikado but were built to a higher axle load, larger cylinders and a much larger boiler for more power and steam-generating ability.  Many aspects of the PRR L1s class were carried over to the Heavy Mikado, although not that locomotive's distinctive Belpaire firebox.

Original owners

USRA originals

Copies

None of the originals built under USRA auspices or any of the subsequent copies were preserved.

References

ALCO locomotives
Baldwin locomotives
Lima locomotives
2-8-2 locomotives
USRA locomotives
Freight locomotives
Standard gauge locomotives of the United States
Railway locomotives introduced in 1918
Scrapped locomotives